Inteliquent is a communications enabler offering network-based voice and messaging services to wireless, cable, carriers and communication service providers. The products of Inteliquent include voice, toll-free, messaging, and emergency services. 
Inteliquent is privately held by GTCR and is headquartered in Chicago, Illinois.

History
In 2003, Inteliquent created the first independent tandem network - a "network of networks" uniquely interconnecting disparate carrier networks to facilitate the exchange of traffic. This network greatly streamlined the way wireless, cable, CLEC and broadband telephony companies routed local transit traffic between one another, and formed the foundation for later interconnection service arrangements.
 1997 - MEANS and MRNet became Onvoy, Inc.
 2001 - Neutral Tandem was incorporated.
 2003 - Neutral Tandem's first location opened at 2 North LaSalle Street in Chicago.
 2004 - Neutral Tandem acquired Origin Communications.
 2006 - Completed the installation of a national IP backbone and extended its reach by interconnecting 179 markets.
 2007 - Neutral Tandem's first public offering on the NASDAQ exchange under the symbol IQNT and Zayo acquired Onvoy, Inc.
 2008 - Neutral Tandem fully transitioned to an all-IP core network. Added terminating and originating switched access services, which are provided in connection with long-distance calls.
 2010 - Named no. 2 on Crain's Fast 50 (fastest-growing companies by five-year revenue growth).  - Completed acquisition of Tinet SpA, an Italian-based global carrier in the IP Transit and Ethernet wholesale market.  - Reached 108.5 billion network billed minutes, an increase of 23.5% over 2009; and revenue of $199.8 million, an increase of 18.3% compared to $168.9 million in 2009.
 2014 - Onvoy, LLC acquired Vitelity, LLC and spun out of Zayo.
 2016 - Acquired next-generation software and switching platform provider Shopety/BetterVoice. GTCR became Onvoy's sole private equity firm. Onvoy acquired ANPI, LLC and ANPI Business, LLC. 
 2017 - GTCR acquired Inteliquent and merged it with Onvoy moving forward as "Inteliquent".
2021 - Sinch acquired Inteliquent for $1.14 billion.

References

External links 
 

Telecommunications companies of the United States
Companies established in 2003